Emil Rinatovich Kenzhesariyev (born 26 March 1987) is a Kyrgyz/Kazakh footballer who last played for Kazakhstan Premier League club FC Aktobe as a defender. He became the top scorer of the 2010 Commonwealth of Independent States Cup, scoring six goals. He is a member of the Kyrgyzstan national football team.

Assault
On 11 August 2013, Kenzhesariyev was assaulted in the Kazakh city of Almaty and was hospitalized in a coma. Reports from Kazakh media stated that he had been operated on for head injuries, and that he remained in a coma but that his condition was improving. He was eventually discharged in late September and is currently undergoing rehab training, expected to make a full recovery.

Honours

Individual 
CIS Cup top goalscorer: 2010

References

External links
 

1987 births
Living people
Kyrgyzstani footballers
Kyrgyzstan international footballers
Kyrgyzstani expatriate footballers
FC Abdysh-Ata Kant players
Kazakhstan Premier League players
FC Zhenis Astana players
FC Aktobe players
FC Bunyodkor players
Uzbekistan Super League players
Kyrgyzstani expatriate sportspeople in Kazakhstan
Expatriate footballers in Kazakhstan
Association football defenders